The Communist Workers' Party of the Netherlands was a council communist party in the Netherlands. It was founded in September 1921, and was modelled after the Communist Workers' Party of Germany. It was far smaller than its German counterpart. At most, in late 1921, it had 8 sections with a total membership of around 200. Herman Gorter played an important role in building the party. The party was affiliated to the Communist Workers' International.

The membership of the party decreased rapidly as the party was engulfed in internal conflicts.

Prominent members 
 Herman Gorter
 Henriette Roland Holst
 Henk Canne-Meijer
 Barend Luteraan

See also
 Communist Workers' Party of Germany
 Communist Workers' Party of Bulgaria

Bibliography

Defunct communist parties in the Netherlands
Political parties established in 1921
Political parties disestablished in 1933
1921 establishments in the Netherlands
1933 establishments in the Netherlands
Council communism
Left communist organizations
Libertarian socialist parties
Netherlands